Henry Joseph Moule  (1825–1904) was an English watercolour artist, and friend of Thomas Hardy.

He was born at Gillingham, Dorset on 25 September 1825, the eldest of eight sons of Henry Moule, and educated at Corpus Christi College, Cambridge, gaining a B.A. in 1848 and M.A. in 1853. He then spent some years as a private tutor, secretary and librarian, to the family of Lord Wriothesley Russell (son of John Russell, 6th Duke of Bedford) and then the Earl Fitzwilliam at Wentworth Woodhouse. He spent the years 1862 - 1877 in Scotland, and then (after a brief sojourn in Ireland) returned to Dorset (where he had grown up). In 1883 he was appointed the first curator of the Dorset County Museum, a post he held until his death on 13 March 1904; he left several thousand paintings to the museum.

He was a close friend of Thomas Hardy for fifty years, their first meeting being shortly before 1854. He was 15 years older than Thomas Hardy, and it seems likely that they met when Henry returned from University to his Father's vicarage at Fordington and Hardy was still quite young. There can be no doubt they were close friends as he encouraged Hardy's development from an impressionable age, was a regular visitor to the Hardy household, and in later life taught Thomas how to paint.  At this time the Moule family were also friendly with the Reverend William Barnes, the Dorset poet and philologist who also acted as a mentor to Thomas Hardy.

References

External links 

 A biography of Henry Joseph Moule at rootsweb.

Alumni of Corpus Christi College, Cambridge
English watercolourists
1825 births
1904 deaths
19th-century English painters
English male painters
19th-century English male artists